Xenophanes is the twelfth studio album by Omar Rodríguez-López as a solo artist. The same members of Omar Rodriguez-Lopez Group who toured Europe in March 2009 (and released Los Sueños de un Hígado around the same time) are featured on this record, created a few months beforehand.  On September 28, 2009 the recording was released digitally via the Rodriguez-Lopez productions website as well as physically in Europe on both CD and yellow vinyl. The recording was released physically in the U.S. on November 10, 2009 on both CD and pink vinyl. A music video directed by Omar for "Asco Que Conmueve los Puntos Erógenos" was released on YouTube on November 30, 2009.

According to drummer Thomas Pridgen, while he was recording for the album he was under the impression Xenophanes would be a Mars Volta album.

In the liner notes, Omar wrote:

"This album is dedicated to and exists in celebration of Cedric Bixler-Zavala and Ximena Sariñana Rivera who have always believed in me and pushed me to be my true self.  Thank you."

Each track of the record, except for "Azoemia" & "Sangrando Detrás de los Ojos", appear in completely different versions on the 2017 album Ensayo de un Desaparecido.

Concept
Quoting the myspace blog: "A conceptual journey through life, death, and rebirth, the album tells the story of a selfish and judgmental female caseworker who falls in love with a male client, only for him to die soon thereafter. Over the course of eleven subsequent lifetimes, the woman experiences life from every conceivable vantage point as her soul evolves, thereby allowing the maturity and eventual letting-go of her ego which in turn enables the realization that the man was, and always has been, her father spirit. Suggesting the fractal and holographic nature of both consciousness and physical reality, the concepts embraced on Xenophanes will appear at least vaguely familiar to anyone with experience in the psychedelic and/or shamanic realms, concepts which Xenophanes himself was likely the first to express within the confines of Western philosophy."

Track listing

Personnel
Omar Rodríguez-López – lead vocals, guitars, producer 
Ximena Sariñana – vocals
Juan Alderete de la Peña – bass guitar
Thomas Pridgen – drums
Marcel Rodriguez-Lopez – synthesizers, piano, percussion
Mark Aanderud – additional keyboards

Release history

References

2009 albums
Omar Rodríguez-López albums
Albums produced by Omar Rodríguez-López